Sikiru Adesina  (1971 – February 8, 2016), popularly known as Arakangudu, was a Nigerian film actor, director and producer. He was best known for taking up roles as either an herbalist, armed robber or occultist in films. On February 8, 2016, he died at his residence in Kaduna, Northern Nigeria.

Filmography

Temi Ni, Tie Ko
Agbede Ogun
Idunnu Mi
Ilu Gangan
Ogbologbo
Iya Oju Ogun
Ere Agbere
Agbede Ogun
Agba Osugbo
Aje Olokun
Iya Oko Bournvita
Igba Owuro
Ayaba Oosa
Ajana oro
Fijabi
Oju Odaran Re
"Basira Badia"
Ogunmola bashorun ibadan”

See also
 List of Nigerian film producers

References

External links

2016 deaths
1971 births
Yoruba male actors
Nigerian male film actors
Nigerian film directors
Nigerian film producers
Male actors in Yoruba cinema